Knemidokoptes mutans, also known as the scaly leg mite, is a species of mite. It was described by Robin and Lanquentin in 1859. There are no listed subspecies.

References

Animals described in 1859
Sarcoptiformes
Parasites of birds